Hiroki Ono (尾野 弘樹, born 15 July 1992) is a Japanese Grand Prix motorcycle racer. He competes in the MFJ All Japan Road Race J-GP2 Championship aboard a Suzuki GSX-R600.

Career

Japan Road Race Championship (JRR)
Born in Nara, and after racing in regional series within Japan, Ono stepped up to the Japan Road Race Championship (JRR) in the 125cc class with the Battle Factory Team in 2007. In 2008 he scored his first podium at Round 5 Suzuka with a 2nd-place finish and finished that season 3rd in the standings. That same year he also got a chance to race as a wild card in the 125cc class of the MotoGP Japanese Grand Prix which was held at Twin Ring Motegi and finished the race in 24th.

In 2009, Ono won his first JRR race at Round 3 Autopolis and finished the season 3rd for the 2nd consecutive year. It was also his 2nd consecutive year that he finished as champion in the standings designated as the Youth Cup which only counts riders aged 17 years or younger.

Also in 2009 after the JRR season ended, Ono made two wild card entries in the 125cc class of the CEV (Campeonato Español de Velocidad; Spanish Motorcycle Championships).  The bike he rode was the KTM that Tomoyoshi Koyama had ridden during the previous MotoGP 125cc Championship season, and marked his debut with an outstanding 3rd-place finish at Jerez.

Italian National Motorcycle Championship (CIV)
For 2010 Ono had plans going to compete as a full-time rider in the CEV but decided to race in the CIV (Italian Championship) at the last minute.  He started his CIV season with the prestigious RUMI team, who were developing their original machine, as their test and race rider.  Ono's first race of the season came at Round 2 Monza and scored his first podium (3rd) at Round 6 Misano. He finished the season 5th in the standings.

Also this year Ono made two wild-card entries to the All Japan series at Round 2 Autopolis and Round 7 Suzuka. The Autopolis race was cancelled due to extreme weather, but won the 7th and final round at Suzuka. In addition, he raced in the Albacete round of the European Championship in which only riders within high rankings in each European nation's national championships can participate in. However, Ono was not able to finish the race.

125cc World Championship
In 2011 Ono started the season in the MotoGP 125cc class with the Caretta Technology Forward Team, from Italy. His bike was a KTM, meaning no developments on the bike had been made since 2009, the year that the manufacturer withdrew from the championship.  Ono showed his skills and potential by finishing a shocking 8th with that bike at a wet Round 2 Jerez, but lost his seat 3 rounds later to French rider Alexis Masbou.  Ono's last MotoGP race of the season was Round 4 Le Mans.

Asia Dream Cup
For the 2012 season Ono switched to the Asia Dream Cup, a one-make series in which every rider rides a Honda CBR250R provided by Honda. Ono's crash on the main stretch right before the chequered flag in Round 2 Indonesia resulted in a broken neck but healed in time for the following round in which he finished 1st and 2nd. He finished the season second overall behind fellow Japanese rider Hikari Okubo despite having four more wins. He remained in the Asia Dream Cup for 2013 and became champion.

Moto3 World Championship
In 2013 Ono made a one-off wildcard appearance at his home race at Motegi, but he failed to finish the race. In 2014, Ono made another wildcard entry at Aragon and finished the race in eleventh place.

Ono made a full-time return to World Championship level, competing in Moto3 with Leopard Racing; he partnered Danny Kent and Efrén Vázquez in the team. Riding a Honda, Ono's best result was eighth place at the final round of the season, in Valencia.

For 2016, Ono left Leopard Racing to join Honda Team Asia alongside Khairul Idham Pawi, again riding a Honda. He finished the season at 23rd place, scoring 36 points.

Career statistics

Japan Road Race Championship

Spanish National Motorcycle Championship (CEV)

Races by year
(key) (Races in bold indicate pole position, races in italics indicate fastest lap)

Italian National Motorcycle Championship (CIV)

Grand Prix motorcycle racing

By season

Races by year
(key) (Races in bold indicate pole position; races in italics indicate fastest lap)

Asia Dream Cup

References

External links

Living people
1992 births
Japanese motorcycle racers
125cc World Championship riders
Moto3 World Championship riders